November 27 - Eastern Orthodox liturgical calendar - November 29

All fixed commemorations below are observed on December 11 by Orthodox Churches on the Old Calendar.

For November 28, Orthodox Churches on the Old Calendar commemorate the Saints listed on November 15.

Saints

 Hieromartyr Acacius, Martyr Irenarchus and Seven Women-martyrs at Sebaste (303) 
 Martyrs at Tiberiopolis (361-362):
 Timothy and Theodore, bishops; 
 Peter, John, Sergius, Theodore, and Nicephorus, presbyters; 
 Basil and Thomas, deacons; 
 Hieroteus, Daniel, Chariton, Socrates, Comasius, and Eusebius, monks; 
 Etymasius, martyr.
 Saint Theodore, Bishop of Theodosiopolis in Armenia (end of 6th century)
 Saint Maurice, Emperor of Rome, and his six sons (602)
 Venerable Monk-martyr and Confessor Stephen the New of Mt. St. Auxentius (767) 
 Martyrs: Basil, Stephen, Gregory, another Gregory, John, Andrew, Peter, Anna, and many others (767)
 Saint Romanos, Bishop of Macedonia.

Pre-Schism Western saints

 Saint Rufus and Companions, a citizen of Rome who was martyred with his entire household under Diocletian (304) 
 Saints Papinianus and Mansuetus, Bishops in North Africa martyred under the Arian Vandal King Genseric (5th century) 
 Saints Valerian, Urban, Crescens, Eustacius Cresconius, Crescentian, Felix, Hortulanus and Florentian, Bishops from North Africa exiled by the Arian King Genseric (5th century) 
 Saint Fionnchu, the successor of St. Comgall at the monastery of Bangor in Ireland (6th century)
 Saint Oda of Brabant, the Blind Princess of Scotland (c. 726)  (see also: October 23 )
 Saint Hippolytus, Bishop of Saint-Claude in France (c. 775)

Post-Schism Orthodox saints

 Blessed Theodore, Archbishop of Rostov (1394)
 Martyr Christos the Gardener, of Albania, at Constantinople (1748)

New martyrs and confessors

 New Hieromartyr Seraphim (Chichagov), Metropolitan of St. Petersburg (1937)

 New Hieromartyrs Alexis Veselovsky, Alexis Smirnov, and Basil Zavgorodnego, Priests (1937)

 New Hieromartyr Raphael (Tyupin), hieromonk of the Zlatoustov Monastery, Moscow  (1937)
 New Monkmartyr Vincent (Nikolsky) of Optina Monastery (1937)
 Virgin-martyr Anysia Maslanovoy (1937)
 Virgin-Martyr Paraskeva Fedorov (1938)
 New Hieromartyr Nicholas Krylov, Priest (1941).

Other commemorations

 Uncovering of the relics (2000) of Venerable Sergius (Srebriansky), Archimandrite, of Tver (1948)

Icon gallery

Notes

References

Sources
 November 28 / December 11. Orthodox Calendar (PRAVOSLAVIE.RU).
 December 11 / November 28. Holy Trinity Russian Orthodox Church (A parish of the Patriarchate of Moscow).
 November 28. OCA - The Lives of the Saints.
 The Autonomous Orthodox Metropolia of Western Europe and the Americas (ROCOR). St. Hilarion Calendar of Saints for the year of our Lord 2004. St. Hilarion Press (Austin, TX). p. 89.
 The Twenty-Eighth Day of the Month of November. Orthodoxy in China.
 November 28. Latin Saints of the Orthodox Patriarchate of Rome.
 The Roman Martyrology. Transl. by the Archbishop of Baltimore. Last Edition, According to the Copy Printed at Rome in 1914. Revised Edition, with the Imprimatur of His Eminence Cardinal Gibbons. Baltimore: John Murphy Company, 1916. p. 366-367.
 Rev. Richard Stanton. A Menology of England and Wales, or, Brief Memorials of the Ancient British and English Saints Arranged According to the Calendar, Together with the Martyrs of the 16th and 17th Centuries. London: Burns & Oates, 1892. pp. 568–569.
Greek Sources
 Great Synaxaristes:  28 ΝΟΕΜΒΡΙΟΥ. ΜΕΓΑΣ ΣΥΝΑΞΑΡΙΣΤΗΣ.
  Συναξαριστής. 28 Νοεμβρίου. ECCLESIA.GR. (H ΕΚΚΛΗΣΙΑ ΤΗΣ ΕΛΛΑΔΟΣ). 
  28/11/2015. Ορθόδοξος Συναξαριστής. 
Russian Sources
  11 декабря (28 ноября). Православная Энциклопедия под редакцией Патриарха Московского и всея Руси Кирилла (электронная версия). (Orthodox Encyclopedia - Pravenc.ru).
  28 ноября по старому стилю / 11 декабря по новому стилю. Русская Православная Церковь - Православный церковный календарь на 2018 год.

November in the Eastern Orthodox calendar